Maurice Lafforgue (26 March 1915 – 31 October 1999) was a French alpine skier who competed in the 1936 Winter Olympics. He was born in Bagnères-de-Luchon and was the father of Britt Lafforgue and Ingrid Lafforgue. In 1936, he finished eleventh in the alpine skiing combined event.

References

 Alpine skiing 1936 

1915 births
1999 deaths
French male alpine skiers
Olympic alpine skiers of France
Alpine skiers at the 1936 Winter Olympics
20th-century French people